Shakuntala Railway was a  narrow-gauge railway line between Yavatmal and Achalpur in Maharashtra in central India.

History 

Killick, Nixon and Company, set up in 1857, created the Central Provinces Railway Company (CPRC) to act as its agents. The company built the 2 ft 6 in (762 mm) narrow-gauge line in 1903. The company built this narrow-gauge line in 1903 to carry cotton from cotton-rich interior areas of Vidarbha to the Murtajapur Junction on main broad gauge line to Mumbai from where it was shipped to Manchester in England. Murtajapur Junction was the focal point of this railway. In 1920 line from Darwha-Pusad was dismantled. Though, working autonomously, the CPRC was grouped in 1952 under the Central Railways. A ZD-steam engine, built in 1921 in Manchester, pulled the train for more than 70 long years after being put in service in 1923. It was withdrawn on 15 April 1994, and replaced by a diesel engine.

Conversion to broad gauge 

In 2016, Indian Railways announced that the Shakuntala Railway would be converted to  broad gauge. The conversion to broad gauge started in 2020.

See also 
 Shakuntala Express

References

Vidarbha
2 ft 6 in gauge railways in India
Defunct railway companies of India